Bob Baker (born Stanley Leland Weed, November 8, 1910 – August 29, 1975) was a singer who had several starring roles as a singing cowboy in the late 1930s.

Early years

The son of Guy Weed and Ethel Leland Weed, Baker was born in Forest City, Iowa. He spent part of his childhood and youth in Colorado and Arizona. Unlike most movie cowboys, Baker really worked as a cowboy in his youth, and was a rodeo champion when he was sixteen. He joined the army at the age of 18, where he learned to play the guitar.

Early career
Baker began singing professionally at the age of twenty, for the KTSM radio station in El Paso, Texas. In Chicago he spent several months with WLS. As a professional rodeo roper and rider, he competed in Cheyenne, Wyoming, Pendleton, Oregon, and Salinas, California, among other sites.

In 1935 he married Evelyn. They were to have four children.

Film career

Baker won a Universal Studios screen test in 1937 in competition against Leonard Slye (Roy Rogers), and became the studio's lead singing cowboy. Known as "Tumbleweed" Baker, he starred in a dozen pictures before suffering an injury and being demoted to secondary roles. He performed many of his own stunts. Baker starred in the "B" western Courage of the West (1937) with Lois January.  She said, "Bob Baker was too pretty! He was nice, but didn't get friendly.  He didn't want me to sing a song in his picture.  That business is full of jealousy...".
This movie, his first, was thought to be his best. The others suffered from predictable plots and poor scripts.

Fuzzy Knight worked with Baker as a sidekick on his first four films.
Starting with The Last Stand (1938) Baker rode Apache, a pinto he had bought in Arizona.
A well-trained horse, Apache tolerated his signature trick of vaulting over the horse's rear into the saddle.
Between work on the sets, Baker had to tour and perform at movie theatres,
in part to promote the pictures and in part to earn extra income.
Bob Baker accompanied his singing with a Gibson Advanced Jumbo guitar.
He did not make any recordings.

In a poll of 1939, Baker was rated tenth in a list of moneymaking Western stars.
However, he did not have the star quality of a performer like Gene Autry.
In 1939 he was partnered with Johnny Mack Brown and Fuzzy Knight in a series of movies where Brown clearly emerged as the star.
His career went downhill, and he began playing in secondary roles, then in bit parts.

In the 1940s, Baker's work in films was limited to performing stunts in films that included Gung Ho (1943), Phantom Lady, (1944), and Ali Baba and the Forty Thieves (1944).

Later years

After leaving the movie industry Baker served again in the army in World War II. He then became a member of the police force of Flagstaff, Arizona. He once again served in the US Army during the Korean War. He later ran a dude ranch and became an expert in leather crafts.

Death
Baker had a series of heart attacks toward the end of his life and died of a stroke on August 29, 1975, in Prescott, Arizona. He was buried at the Clear Creek Cemetery in Camp Verde, Arizona.

Films

References
Citations

Sources

External links
 

1910 births
1975 deaths
Singing cowboys
20th-century American singers
20th-century American male actors
Male Western (genre) film actors
20th-century American male singers